Tallahala Creek is a river in the southeast part of the U.S. state of Mississippi. It flows from north to south, joining the Leaf River east of Hattiesburg.

Names
Tallahala is a name derived from the Choctaw language purported to mean "standing rocks".

According to the Geographic Names Information System, Tallahala Creek has also been known as:

East Tallahala Creek
Fiume Tale Houma
Hashlupbacher Creek
Hashlupbatcher Creek
Hashluphatcher Creek
Hooma Creek
Talahala Creek
Talahola Creek
Talla Creek
Talla Halla Creek
Tallahala River
Tallahalah Creek
Tallahalie Creek
Tallahalla Creek
Tallahalla River
Tallahoma Creek
Tallahuta Creek
Tallee Hooma River
Tallyhomo River
West Fork Tallahala Creek

References

Rivers of Mississippi
Rivers of Jasper County, Mississippi
Rivers of Jones County, Mississippi
Rivers of Perry County, Mississippi
Mississippi placenames of Native American origin